Kórós is a village in Hungary, Baranya county, in the Ormánság region. The village lies near the river Drava. The Calvinist church of Kórós is famous for its painted ceiling, which is considered a masterpiece of Hungarian folk art.

References

Populated places in Baranya County